Libero Ferrario (6 July 1901 – 14 February 1930) was an Italian cyclist.

He died of tuberculosis at age 28.

The stadium of his hometown of Parabiago is named after him, as is the Targa Libero Ferrario, an amateur cycling race in Italy.

Major results
1922
1st Coppa Bernocchi
1923
1st  UCI World Amateur Road Race Championships
1st Piccolo Giro di Lombardia
1st Coppa Città di Busto Arsizio
1st Coppa Bernocchi
1924
1st Tre Valli Varesine

References

1901 births
1930 deaths
People from Parabiago 
Italian male cyclists
20th-century deaths from tuberculosis
Tuberculosis deaths in Italy
Infectious disease deaths in Lombardy
Cyclists from the Metropolitan City of Milan